The canton of Is-sur-Tille is an administrative division of the Côte-d'Or department, eastern France. Its borders were modified at the French canton reorganisation which came into effect in March 2015. Its seat is in Is-sur-Tille.

It consists of the following communes:
 
Avelanges
Avot
Barjon
Boussenois
Busserotte-et-Montenaille
Bussières
Chaignay
Chanceaux
Chazeuil
Courlon
Courtivron
Crécey-sur-Tille
Cussey-les-Forges
Diénay
Échevannes
Épagny
Francheville
Foncegrive
Fraignot-et-Vesvrotte
Frénois
Gemeaux
Grancey-le-Château-Neuvelle
Is-sur-Tille
Lamargelle
Léry
Lux
Marcilly-sur-Tille
Marey-sur-Tille
Marsannay-le-Bois
Le Meix
Moloy
Orville
Pellerey
Pichanges
Poiseul-la-Grange
Poiseul-lès-Saulx
Poncey-sur-l'Ignon
Sacquenay
Salives
Saulx-le-Duc
Selongey
Spoy
Tarsul
Til-Châtel
Vaux-Saules
Vernois-lès-Vesvres
Vernot
Véronnes
Villecomte
Villey-sur-Tille

References

Cantons of Côte-d'Or